This list of theatrical animated feature films consists of animated films released theatrically, whether wide or limited, in the United States, between 1937 and 1999.

Made-for-TV and direct-to-video films will not be featured on this list, unless they have had a theatrical release in some form. Primarily live-action films with heavy use of special effects are also not included.

Films

Released

See also 
 List of American theatrical animated feature films (2000-2019)
 List of American theatrical animated feature films (2020-present)
 List of Disney theatrical animated feature films
 List of 20th Century Studios theatrical animated feature films
 List of Universal Pictures theatrical animated feature films
 List of Paramount Pictures theatrical animated feature films
 List of Sony theatrical animated feature films
 List of Warner Bros. theatrical animated feature films
 List of Metro-Goldwyn-Mayer theatrical animated feature films
 List of Lionsgate theatrical animated feature films
 List of anime theatrically released in the United States

References

External links 
 List of fully animated features theatrically released in the United States, compiled by Jerry Beck

Lists of animated films
American animated films
20th century-related lists
 1937